The year 1887 in science and technology involved many significant events, listed below.

Astronomy
 April – Carte du Ciel project initiated by Paris Observatory director Amédée Mouchez.
 Theodor von Oppolzer's Canon der Finsternisse, a compilation of the 8,000 solar and 5,200 lunar eclipses from 1200 BC until 2161 AD, is published posthumously.

Biology
 Jean Pierre Mégnin publishes Faune des Tombeaux ("Fauna of the Tombs"), the founding work of modern forensic entomology.
 Sergei Winogradsky discovers the first known form of lithotrophy during his research with Beggiatoa.
 The Petri dish is created by German bacteriologist Julius Richard Petri.

Chemistry
 Amphetamine is first synthesized in Germany by Romanian chemist Lazăr Edeleanu, who names it phenylisopropylamine.
 Otto Schott produces 'Normalthermometerglas' (family of Borosilicate glass) for the first time.

Cartography
 Guyou hemisphere-in-a-square projection developed by Émile Guyou.

Climate
 January 28 – In a snowstorm at Fort Keogh, Montana, in the United States, the largest snowflakes on record are reported. They are 15 inches (38 cm) wide and 8 inches (20 cm) thick.
 September 28 – Start of the Yellow River floods in China: 900,000 dead.

Conservation
 June 23 – The Rocky Mountains Park Act becomes law in Canada, creating that nation's first national park, Banff National Park.

Earth sciences
 February 23 – The French Riviera is hit by a large earthquake, killing around 2,000 along the coast of the Mediterranean Sea.
 In Hawaii, the Mauna Loa volcano eruptions subside, having begun in 1843. During the 1887 eruption, about 2½ million tons (2.3 million metric tons) of lava per hour pours out, covering an area of 29 km2.

Linguistics

 March 3 – Anne Sullivan begins to teach language to the deaf and blind Helen Keller.
 July 26 – L. L. Zamenhof publishes Lingvo internacia ("International language") under the pseudonym "Doktoro Esperanto".

Mathematics
 Joseph Louis François Bertrand rediscovers Bertrand's ballot theorem.
 Henri Poincaré provides a solution to the three-body problem.

Medicine
 January 11 – Louis Pasteur's anti-rabies treatment is defended in the French Academy of Medicine by Dr. Joseph Grancher.
 August – The U.S. National Institutes of Health is founded at the Marine Hospital, Staten Island, NY, as the Laboratory of Hygiene.
 October 1 – Hong Kong College of Medicine for Chinese founded by Patrick Manson.
 Franz König publishes "Über freie Körper in den Gelenken" in the journal Deutsche Zeitschrift für Chirurgie, first describing (and naming) the disease Osteochondritis dissecans.
 The Hospitals Association establishes the first (non-statutory and voluntary) register of nurses in the United Kingdom.

Physics

 November – The Michelson–Morley experiment is performed, indicating that the speed of light is independent of motion.
 Heinrich Hertz discovers the photoelectric effect on the production and reception of electromagnetic waves in radio, an important step towards the understanding of the quantum nature of light.

Psychology
 November – G. Stanley Hall founds The American Journal of Psychology.
 Richard Hodgson and S. J. Davey, in the course of investigations into popular belief in parapsychology, publish one of the first descriptions of eyewitness unreliability.

Technology
 March 8 – Everett Horton of Connecticut patents a fishing rod of telescoping steel tubes.
 March 13 – Chester Greenwood patents earmuffs.
 June 8 – Herman Hollerith receives a U.S. patent for his punched card calculator.
 July – James Blyth operates the first working wind turbine at Marykirk in Scotland.
 July 19 – Dorr Eugene Felt receives the first U.S. patent for his comptometer.
 August – Anna Connelly patents the fire escape.
 November 8 – Emile Berliner is granted a U.S. patent for his Gramophone.
 Adolf Gaston Eugen Fick invents the contact lens, made of a type of brown glass.
 English engineer James Atkinson invents his "Cycle Engine".
 Mexican general Manuel Mondragón patents the Mondragón rifle, the world's first automatic rifle.
 Alfred Yarrow completes the first practical high-pressure water-tube Yarrow boiler, for a torpedo boat.

Organizations
 March 7 – North Carolina State University is established as North Carolina College of Agriculture and Mechanic Arts.
 October 3 – Florida A&M University opens its doors in Tallahassee, Florida.

Publications
 Publication in Barcelona of Enrique Gaspar's El anacronópete, the first work of fiction to feature a time machine.

Awards
 June – William Armstrong created 1st Baron Armstrong of Cragside, the first engineer to be raised to the Peerage of the United Kingdom
 Copley Medal: Joseph Dalton Hooker
 Wollaston Medal for Geology: John Whitaker Hulke

Births
 January 7 – Kurt Schneider (died 1967), German psychiatrist.
 January 15 – Henry Fairfield Osborn, Jr. (died 1969), American conservationist.
 January 28 – Edmund Jaeger (died 1983), American naturalist.
 April 20 – Margaret Newton (died 1971), Canadian plant pathologist.
 June 22 – Julian Huxley (died 1975), English biologist and populariser of science.
 July 30 – Felix Andries Vening Meinesz (died 1966), Dutch geophysicist.
 August 18 – Erwin Schrödinger (died 1961), Austrian physicist.
 September 26 – Barnes Wallis (died 1979), English aeronautical engineer.
 October 11 – María Teresa Ferrari (died 1956), Argentine physician.
 November 10 – Elisa Leonida Zamfirescu (died 1973), Romanian engineer.
 November 19 – James B. Sumner (died 1955), American winner of the 1946 Nobel Prize in Chemistry.
 November 23 – Henry Moseley (killed 1915), English physicist.
 November 25 (November 13 Old Style) – Nikolai Vavilov (died 1943), Russian plant pathologist.
 December 13 – George Pólya (died 1985), Hungarian mathematician.
 December 22 – Srinivasa Ramanujan (died 1920), Indian mathematician.
 December 27 – Edward Andrade (died 1971), English physicist.

Deaths
 January 22 – Joseph Whitworth (born 1803), English mechanical engineer.
 February 26 – Anandi Gopal Joshi (born 1865), Indian physician.
 July 17 – Henry William Ravenel (born 1814), American botanist.
 July 18 – Dorothea Dix (born 1802), American mental health reformer.
 August 2 – Joseph-Louis Lambot (born 1814), French inventor of ferrocement.
 August 15 – Julius von Haast (born 1824), German geologist.
 August 19
 Spencer Fullerton Baird (born 1823), American ornithologist and ichthyologist.
 Alvan Clark (born 1804), American telescope manufacturer.
 October 7 (O.S. September 25) – Lev Tsenkovsky (born 1822), Russian biologist.
 October 17 – Gustav Kirchhoff (born 1824), German physicist.
 November 18 – Gustav Fechner (born 1801), German psychologist.

References

 
19th century in science
1880s in science